The Formoso River is a river of Rondônia state in western Brazil.
It is a tributary of the Jaci Paraná River.

In its upper reaches the Formoso River defines the western boundary of the Guajará-Mirim State Park.
The park has two support bases on the banks of the Formoso River that are used by researchers and inspection teams.

See also
List of rivers of Rondônia

References

Sources

Rivers of Rondônia